Karpoora Deepam is a 1985 Indian Tamil-language film, directed by A. Jagannathan and produced by Mylai RV. Gurupatham. The film stars Sivakumar, Sujatha, Ambika and Goundamani. It is a remake of the Telugu film Karthika Deepam. The film was released on 31 May 1985.

Plot

Cast 
Sivakumar
Sujatha
Ambika
Ashwini
Goundamani

Soundtrack 
Soundtrack was composed by Gangai Amaran.

Reception
Jayamanmadhan of Kalki felt it has become a fashion to give new colour to old plots and added all the actors performed well but none of them gets registered in the mind and concluded that director should be asked for this.

References

External links 
 

1980s Tamil-language films
1985 films
Films directed by A. Jagannathan
Films scored by Gangai Amaran
Tamil remakes of Telugu films